Pinellia is a genus of plants in the family Araceae native to East Asia (China, Korea, Japan).  Its species are commonly called green dragons due to the color and shape of the inflorescence, which possesses a green, hooded spathe from which protrudes a long, tongue-like extension of the spadix. The leaves vary greatly in shape among different species, from simple and cordate to compound with three to many leaflets. Pinellia reproduces rapidly from seed and many species also produce bulbils on the leaves. Both characteristics have allowed some species to become weedy in temperate areas outside their native range, notably Pinellia ternata in eastern North America.

Species

Use in Traditional Chinese Medicine
The processed root, known as Zhi ban xia or Ban xia, is one of the most important herbs in Chinese Medicine to transform phlegm and stop coughing.  The herb is warm and drying and should be used only in people who are not hot or dry (known as yin deficient.) It is used in small 3-6 gram dosages in herbal formulas to warmly dry the lungs, to stop nausea and vomiting, and to address goiters or scrofula. Slices of the dried root are also used as a base for moxibustion. Because the raw root is toxic, it is soaked in water to remove oxalates and other irritants, or processed with ginger.  Unprocessed root is only used externally in Chinese Medicine.

When listed as an ingredient in a supplement for weight loss or energy, Pinellia has been charged with indicating the presence of ephedra alkaloids, which would be a violation of labeling laws.

References

External links
 Pinellia tripartita Images

Aroideae
Araceae genera
Flora of China
Flora of Eastern Asia